Events during the year 1191 in Italy.

Events 
 In August, Sicilians defeat an invasion of Henry VI, Holy Roman Emperor; Empress Constance is captured and later imprisoned at Castel dell'Ovo at Naples.

Years of the 12th century in Italy
Italy
Italy